The Kansas City, Pittsburg and Gulf Railroad was a railway company that began operations in the 1890s and owned a main-line between Kansas City, Missouri, and Port Arthur, Texas.  It was led by Arthur Stilwell before being thrown into receivership and eventually being absorbed by the Kansas City Southern Railway in 1900.

Trackage on the KCP&G was complete from Kansas City to Shreveport, Louisiana as of March 2, 1897.  By September 11 of that year, the line ran all the way to Port Arthur, Texas– a town Stilwell essentially created and named after himself.   However, the railroad was in financial trouble by 1899.  On April 1st, 1900, the Kansas City Southern Railway took control of the KCP&G properties after purchasing them at a foreclosure sale in Joplin, Missouri.

The section of the line within the boundaries of Louisiana was chartered as the Kansas City, Shreveport & Gulf Railway Company (KCS&G).

References

Predecessors of the Kansas City Southern Railway
Defunct Arkansas railroads
Defunct Missouri railroads
Defunct Kansas railroads
Railway companies established in 1893
Railway companies disestablished in 1900
Defunct Louisiana railroads
Defunct Oklahoma railroads
American companies established in 1893
American companies disestablished in 1900